Felony is the third studio album by American metalcore group Emmure under the Victory Records label. It was released on August 18, 2009. The album debuted at #60 on the Billboard Top 200 selling roughly 8,000 copies in its first week. Felony is also the first album to feature new members Mike Mulholland on guitar and Mike Kaabe on drums, replacing founding members Ben and Joe Lionetti, respectively.

Inspiration and musical style

Inspiration
The album is allegedly inspired by a real event in which vocalist Frankie Palmeri assaulted his best friend by "[hitting] him in the head with a bottle", which resulted in Palmeri being arrested. The lyrics for the album's title track also references this anecdote.

Style
Felony is the first album by Emmure to draw on more of a nu metal influence than their previous albums, evident the more-frequent bounce riffs and other tropes such as rapping vocals. AllMusic stated "...their streamlined brand of East Coast hardcore, death metal, and punk is as reliable as it is predictable." MetalSucks noted that the album features gangsta rap elements.

Several songs on the album reference popular culture media. Examples include the song title "I <3 EC2" (which is a reference to the film Planet Terror). The song "The Philosophy of Time Travel" is the title to a fictional book from the film, Donnie Darko; the guitar riffs played on the track are similar to the melody of the song from the film's score, much of the lyrics were inspired by the film as well.

The title of the second track, "I Thought You Met Telly and Turned Me Into Casper," is a reference to two characters from the 1995 film Kids; Telly (Leo Fitzpatrick) and his friend Casper (Justin Pierce).

The song "R2deepthroat" contains a verse of lyrics found in the 1995 hip hop song "Shook Ones (Part II)" by Mobb Deep, which was done as an homage to New York hip hop.

Track listing

Personnel
Emmure
 Frankie Palmeri - vocals
 Jesse Ketive - guitar
 Mike Mulholland - guitar
 Mark Davis - bass guitar
 Michael Kaabe - drums

Production
 Produced by Bryan Goldsman and Antoine Lussier
 Engineered by Yanick Desgroseilliers and Antoine Lussier
 Mixed by Antoine Lussier
 Mastered by Pierre Rémillard
 Photography by Jeremy Saffer

References

2009 albums
Emmure albums
Victory Records albums